Lyle is an unincorporated community in Decatur County, Kansas, United States.

History
A post office was opened in Lyle in 1877, and remained in operation until it was discontinued in 1907.

Education
The community is served by Oberlin USD 294 public school district.

References

Further reading

External links
 Decatur County maps: Current, Historic, KDOT

Unincorporated communities in Decatur County, Kansas
Unincorporated communities in Kansas